Game Over is a 2019 Indian psychological thriller film directed by Ashwin Saravanan. Produced by YNOT Studios and Reliance Entertainment, the film stars Taapsee Pannu as a woman with PTSD who is defending her home from mysterious intruders. The film was shot simultaneously in Tamil and Telugu. The film was also dubbed in Hindi and was presented by Anurag Kashyap. The dialogues were written by Ashwin Saravanan and Kaavya Ramkumar in Tamil and Venkat Kacharla in Telugu. The music is composed by Ron Ethan Yohann.

Principal photography commenced on 10 October 2018. The film was released on 14 June 2019 to mostly positive reviews.

Plot

Game Over starts with a serial killer (whose face is not revealed) stalking a girl with cancer from outside her house and later at midnight killing her by wrapping her head in plastic and tying her hands behind her. After that he takes her to an abandoned field where he beheads her and sets her body on fire.

Later, the film focuses on Swapna (Taapsee Pannu) who is a single young woman and also a talented game designer. She has a fear of the darkness, and also has post-traumatic stress more so known as 'anniversary reaction', a condition, which triggers unsettling feelings around the anniversary of a traumatic event. For Swapna, it is the horrific memory of her rape that took place on last New Year's Eve.

It is her second time that she suffers from the uncontrollable feeling whenever she enters darkness; the first time was one year ago, the following days after she was raped. Her symptom starts when she feels pain at her wrist, where there is a tattoo she got one year ago. As she got the tattoo too long ago, it was explained technically impossible by a doctor that the pain was caused by it, but only she knows there is a connection between the tattoo and her miserable memory. Her family have a traditional mindset that think decent girls should not have tattoos or go out in the night; to which she did not listen, and was later raped. Instead of encouraging her afterward, her parents kept blaming the tragedy on her, for having a tattoo and going out at night.

Because of this, she leaves her parents, never contacted them since, and leads a secluded life with Kalamma (Vinodhini Vaidyanathan), a housemaid who stays with her. Her only solace is her love for gaming.  Swapna later learns that her tattoo ink was mixed with a stranger's ash, because of a mistake by the tattoo artist. She begins to have some bizarre dreams and finds that the girl Amutha (Sanchana Natarajan), a cancer survivor, was an unfortunate victim of a serial killer. Amutha's mother tells Swapna that her daughter will always be with her and want her to fight.

The same serial killer that killed many young women in the city, including Amutha, finally targets Swapna, who is now temporarily a wheelchair user due to an attempted suicide. The killer kills Mr Anwar, the security of her house, and Kalamma, and finally Swapna. But before Swapna is killed, she is surprised to find that she has three of the same tattoo pattern on her wrist, where she had only one.

Swapna wakes up from the "nightmare", but finds now only two tattoo patterns are left on her wrist. She now realizes that she was not killed in a dream, but it is Amutha's spirit, who wants Swapna to fight, that gave her three lives, just like video games she is often playing. And now Swapna has lost one life, with two remaining.

To avoid the same mistake that got them all killed in her first life, Swapna, who is now using her second life, call the police and stay in the house with Kalamma to wait for the police. Police arrive in time and shoot the killer before the latter kills Swapna and after, however, kills Kalamma. She seems to be saved and is taken by the police to the station. But on their way, their vehicle is exploded by a bomb set by the killers. It is now revealed that there was not only one killer that was trying to kill her, but three.

Swapna now is using her third, also the last life to fight against the killers. Encouraged by Amutha's spirit, Swapna conquers her fear for darkness. She does not turn on the light to draw the killers' attention. Swapna and Kalamma manages to kill the first killer by setting him on fire. The second killer almost kills them both but is also taken down by them. The third killer beats Kalamma to unconsciousness and confronts Swapna, who manages to stab him to death with a piece of broken mirror.

Cast 
 Taapsee Pannu as Swapna
 Vinodhini Vaidyanathan as Kalamma, home maid of Swapna
 Anish Kuruvilla as Psychiatrist
 Sanchana Natarajan as Amutha (in Tamil) / Amritha (in Telugu)
 Ramya Subramanian as Varsha
 Parvathi T. as Dr. Reena, Amutha's mother (in Tamil) / Amritha's mother (in Telugu)
 David Solomon Raja as Inspector
 Indrajith as Constable
 Krishna Raj as Coffee shop guy
 Subramanian as Anwar, watchman

Production 
The film marks the return of actress Taapsee Pannu to Tamil cinema after a hiatus of four years. The first look poster of the film was unveiled on 10 October 2018, which displayed Taapsee sitting in a wheelchair with legs in plaster casts. The shooting of the film commenced on the very next day on 11 October 2018. Pannu went under intense training playing a person who uses a wheelchair. The shooting of the film was wrapped up on 14 December 2018.

Soundtrack 

The official film score is composed by Ron Ethan Yohann who had worked with Ashwin Saravanan in Maya and Iravaakaalam. The music rights were secured by the production company's subsidiary music label YNOT Music, with Divo as their digital partner. The official soundtrack album was released by Santhosh Narayanan on 24 August 2019. The album features 28 songs which lasts for 67 minutes.

Marketing and release 
The official teaser of the movie was released on 15 May 2019. The trailer of the film was released by Dhanush, Rana Daggubati and Taapsee Pannu in Tamil, Telugu and Hindi on 30 May 2019. The film was released in all three versions on 14 June 2019.

Home media
The Tamil, Telugu and Hindi versions of the film became available as VOD on Netflix in late 2019.

Reception

Critical response 

Nandini Ramnath of Scroll.in praises Pannu and Vaidyanathan for their 'doughty performance' and opines that the writers have delivered a taut and highly watchable thriller. Summing up she says, "[The film] is a taut thriller about demons within and without". Anna M. M. Vetticad of Firstpost gave three and half stars out of five and feels that the film is an inventive, intelligent and terrifying film that doesn't take the viewer lightly. Praising the performance of Taapsee Pannu and direction of Ashwin Saravanan, Anna says, "Game Over is as crisp and to-the-point as a thriller can get." Priyanka Sinha Jha  of News18 rates it with three and half stars out of five, stating the film with its paranormal-meets-noir is a good example where Indian concepts are combined with western. She concludes, that the Hindi version of the film is worth a watch for entertainment and its new-age cinematic virtues. Writing for NDTV Saibal Chatterjee terming screenplay "smart and minimalist", praises the director for his deft handling of the execution and Pannu for her characterisation of the role. He  concludes the review as, "While she [Pannu] may be the primary reason why you must go out and watch this film, it certainly isn't devoid of other intrinsic merits in terms of substance and execution." He rates it with three stars out of five. Raja Sen writing a mixed review for Hindustan Times rated the film with two and half stars out of five and finds, 'Pannu strong in a hysterically distraught role' and Vinodhini Vaidyanathan 'wonderfully warm'. He thinks that the film, inspired from Black Mirror has a solid concept. But, he says, "[it] devolves into a witless muddle in the final act." Baradwaj Rangan of Film Companion South wrote "In short, Game Over is a tight genre-hopping thriller that keeps you guessing about the genre it can be slotted into...The small miracle of the film is that it manages to pack all of this—and a lot more—into 100-something minutes".
 
Negative reviews such as those by Rajeev Masand writing for News18, praise Pannu for her performance but states that, "barring its leading lady's impressive performance, it's simply hit and miss." He rates the film with two and half stars out of five. Shubhra Gupta writing for The Indian Express gives one and half star out of five and finds "writing flabby" and "key sequences repetitive". She says, "There are a couple of genuinely scary moments, but the rest of it is too stretched: even the 102 minute run time feels too long, with not enough thrills or chills."

Box office

Awards and nominations

References

External links 
 
 

2010s Tamil-language films
Indian thriller drama films
Tamil-language psychological thriller films
Films shot in Chennai
Reliance Entertainment films
Films about disability in India
2019 psychological thriller films
Indian multilingual films
2019 multilingual films
2010s Telugu-language films